Vermont Street may refer to:

 Vermont Street (San Francisco), known for its twists and turns
 Blue Island–Vermont Street station, a railway station in Blue Island, Illinois, the US